John Fraser (1882 – 18 May 1945) was Jesus Professor of Celtic at the University of Oxford.

Life
He was born in Inverness, Scotland, and studied at the University of Aberdeen, Trinity College, Cambridge and the University of Jena.  After lecturing in Celtic at Aberdeen University, he was appointed Jesus Professor of Celtic in 1921, becoming thereby a Professorial Fellow of Jesus College, Oxford.  He held the position until his death in 1945.

He had a particular research interest in Scottish Gaelic and Scottish place name studies, but left no substantial work beyond his many contributions to learned periodicals.  His papers are now held by Aberdeen University.

References

1882 births
1945 deaths
Alumni of Trinity College, Cambridge
Academics of the University of Aberdeen
Fellows of Jesus College, Oxford
Celtic studies scholars
Jesus Professors of Celtic
Date of birth missing